Covering Ground is the third studio album by American musician Chuck Ragan, which was recorded in 2011 and produced by Christopher Thorn. The album was recorded during Hot Water Music's hiatus and features a strong folk influence with themes surrounding the life on the road away from loved ones. Brian Fallon of The Gaslight Anthem and Frank Turner are both featured as guest vocalists on selected tracks.

Track listing

"Lost and Found" concludes at 4:09; a hidden track called "Camaraderie of the Commons" starts at 9:04.

References

External links
Chuck Ragan
Chuck Ragan at SideOneDummy Records

Chuck Ragan albums
2011 albums
SideOneDummy Records albums